Servet is the Turkish and Albanian  (name)  People named Servet include:

Given name
Ethem Servet Boral (1876–1956?), Ottoman officer
Servet Coşkun (born 1990), Turkish sport wrestler
Servet Çetin (born 1981), Turkish footballer
Servet A. Duran, Turkish-American Materials Science professor
Servet Kocakaya (born 1973), Turkish singer of Kurdish origin 
Servet Libohova, Albanian politician
Servet Pëllumbi (born 1936), Albanian politician
Servet Tazegül (born 1988), Turkish taekwondo athlete
Servet Teufik Agaj, Albanian footballer
Servet Uzunlar (born 1989), Turkish–Australian footballer

Surname
Miguel Servet, Spanish theologian and physician

Also there was a publication with that name:
 Servet (Ottoman Empire)

See also 
9629 Servet, main-belt asteroid 

Turkish unisex given names